Vincent "Vince" Gribbin (first ¼ 1965) is a former professional rugby league footballer who played in the 1980s and 1990s.

Background
Vince Gribbin's birth was registered in Whitehaven, Cumberland, England.

Playing career

International honours
Vince Gribbin won a cap for Great Britain while at Whitehaven in 1985 against France.

Career records
Vince Gribbin held Whitehaven's "tries in a season" record with 31-tries, beating Bill Smith's previous record of 29-ties, this was subsequently extended to 34-tries by Mick Pechey, he holds Whitehaven's "tries in a match" record with 6-tries against Doncaster on Sunday 18 November 1984.

Honoured at Whitehaven
Vince Gribbin is a Whitehaven Hall Of Fame Inductee.

References

External links
!Great Britain Statistics at englandrl.co.uk (statistics currently missing due to not having appeared for both Great Britain, and England)
The Immortals… and the Hall of Fame

1965 births
Living people
English rugby league players
Great Britain national rugby league team players
Rugby league centres
Rugby league players from Whitehaven
Salford Red Devils players
Whitehaven R.L.F.C. players